The 2018 South American Under-17 Women's Football Championship was the 6th edition of the South American Under-17 Women's Football Championship, the biennial international youth football championship organised by the CONMEBOL for the women's under-17 national teams of South America. The tournament was held in Argentina between 7–25 March 2018.

The top two teams of the tournament qualified for the 2018 FIFA U-17 Women's World Cup in Uruguay as the CONMEBOL representatives, besides Uruguay who qualified automatically as hosts.

Brazil were crowned champions for the third time. Venezuela were the defending champions, but could only finish fourth.

Teams
All ten CONMEBOL member national teams are eligible to enter the tournament.

Venues
All matches were played in Estadio San Juan del Bicentenario, San Juan.

Draw
The draw of the tournament was held on 28 February 2018, 12:00 ART (UTC−3), at the Estadio Aldo Cantoni in San Juan. The ten teams were drawn into two groups of five teams. The hosts Argentina and the defending champions Venezuela were seeded into Groups A and B respectively, while the remaining teams were placed into four "pairing pots" according to their results in the 2016 South American Under-17 Women's Football Championship: Brazil–Paraguay, Colombia–Uruguay, Chile–Ecuador, Peru–Bolivia.

Squads

Players born on or after 1 January 2001 are eligible to compete in the tournament. Each team could register a maximum of 22 players (three of whom must be goalkeepers).

First stage
In the first stage, the teams are ranked according to points (3 points for a win, 1 point for a draw, 0 points for a loss). If tied on points, tiebreakers are applied in the following order (Regulations Article 18.1):
Goal difference;
Goals scored;
Head-to-head result in games between tied teams;
Drawing of lots.

The top two teams of each group advance to the final stage.

On 11 March 2018, the scheduled Group A match between Argentina and Ecuador was not played as players from several teams showed symptoms for food poisoning. The scheduled Group B matches on 12 March 2018 were also postponed as a result. The matches were rescheduled by CONMEBOL with the first stage ending on 18 March instead of 16 March, and the final stage starting on 21 March instead of 19 March.

All times are local, ART (UTC−3).

Group A

Group B

Final stage
In the final stage, the teams are ranked according to points (3 points for a win, 1 point for a draw, 0 points for a loss). If tied on points, tiebreakers are applied in the following order, taking into account only matches in the final stage (Regulations Article 18.2):
Goal difference;
Goals scored;
Head-to-head result in games between tied teams;
Fair play points (first yellow card: minus 1 point; second yellow card / red card: minus 3 points; direct red card: minus 4 points; yellow card and direct red card: minus 5 points);
Drawing of lots.

Winners

Qualified teams for FIFA U-17 Women's World Cup
The following three teams from CONMEBOL qualified for the 2018 FIFA U-17 Women's World Cup, including Uruguay which qualified as hosts.

1 Bold indicates champions for that year. Italic indicates hosts for that year.

Goalscorers
7 goals

 Mairéth Pérez

4 goals

 Natalia Ramírez
 Ángela Gómez
 Bárbara Olivieri

3 goals

 Emily
 Jheniffer

2 goals

 Chiara Signarella
 Júlia
 Isabelle Kadzban
 Ana Paladines
 Cinthia Almada
 Cinthia Arévalos
 Graciela Martínez
 Raiderlin Carrasco
 Wilmary Argüelles

1 goal

 Dalila Ippolito
 Rocío Vázquez
 Majhely Romero
 Miriam Cavalcante
 Larissa
 Layssa
 Antonia Alarcón
 Sonya Keffe
 Lina Jaime
 Laura Orozco
 Gisela Robledo
 Yovela Ruíz
 Lisa Campos
 Karen Flores
 Monserrath Ayala
 Kiara Calmet
 Milena Tomayconsa
 Micaela Domínguez
 Deyna Morales
 Esperanza Pizarro
 Bárbara Sandoval

1 own goal

 Gisseli Calixto (playing against Uruguay)

References

External links
Sudamericano Femenino Sub 17 Argentina 2018, CONMEBOL.com
Sudamericano Femenino Sub 17 Argentina 2018, AFA.org

2018
2018 South American Under-17 Women's Football Championship
Under-17 Women's Football Championship
2017–18 in Argentine football
2018 in women's association football
2018 in youth association football
March 2018 sports events in South America